Ernst II (Ernst Wilhelm Friedrich Carl Maximilian; 13 September 1863 – 11 December 1950) was a German aristocrat and Prince of Hohenlohe-Langenburg. He served as the Regent of the Duchy of Saxe-Coburg and Gotha during the minority of his wife's cousin, Duke Charles Edward, from 1900 to 1905.

Biography

Family
Born in Langenburg, Kingdom of Württemberg on 13 September 1863, Ernst was the oldest of three children, and the only son, of Hermann, Prince of Hohenlohe-Langenburg, and Princess Leopoldine of Baden, daughter of Prince William of Baden. He was the great-nephew of Queen Victoria, His paternal great-grandmother was Princess Victoria of Saxe-Coburg-Saalfeld, the mother of Queen Victoria, and his grandmother was Feodora of Leiningen, Queen Victoria's half-sister. He married the Queen's granddaughter, Princess Alexandra of Edinburgh, daughter of Alfred, Duke of Saxe-Coburg and Gotha and Maria Alexandrovna of Russia, on 20 April 1896 at the Ehrenburg Palace (Schloss Ehrenburg) in Coburg, Germany.

Education
After finishing high school in Karlsruhe, the young prince studied law in Paris, Bonn, Tübingen and Leipzig, where he graduated in 1885 with the first legal exam in Naumburg. He also gained membership in the Corps Suevia Tübingen (1st Class) in 1884, when he was at the University of Tübingen and Borussia Bonn in 1886, because he had gone to the University of Bonn. After his officer training in Berlin-Lichterfelde (1886-1891), he passed the diplomatic examination (1890-1891) with the appointment as Secretary of the Imperial German Embassy in St. Petersburg and London (1891-1894). In the following years he worked in Strasbourg as an assistant for his father, Prince Hermann, the Imperial Governor of Alsace-Lorraine, and prepared himself for his future as a Peer of the Kingdom of Württemberg.

Career
Because his wife was the daughter of Alfred, Duke of Saxe-Coburg and Gotha, Ernst became the Regent of the Duchy after the death of the Duke.  From 30 July 1900 to 18 July 1905, he governed Saxe-Coburg and Gotha on the behalf of the still immature successor, Charles Edward.  In 1901, Ernst was awarded with the Grand Cross of the Order of the Crown of Württemberg. Afterwards, he made several unsuccessful attempts to gain a foothold in the politics of the German Empire.  He served as the Head of the Colonial Department of the Foreign Office (1906–1906) and the Deputy (1907–1911) and Vice President (1909–1910) of the Reichstag.  In 1913, on the death of his father, Ernst became the Prince of Hohelohe-Langeburg, entitling him to sit in the Kammer der Standesherren [House of Lords] of Württemberg, where he had already been serving as his father's deputy since 1895.  He would keep his seat until the November Revolution of 1918.  During the First World War, the Prince was active as a volunteer in the military hospitals as well as the General Delegate to the Eastern Front and Imperial Commissioner and military inspector.  He was also sent in 1915 as a special envoy to Constantinople and the Balkans to assume the duties of the envoy Hans Freiherr von Wangenheim who had fallen ill.

Relationship with the Nazi Party
After Adolf Hitler came to power in 1933, Ernst joined his son (who had already entered in 1931) in the Nazi Party with the membership number of 3726902.

Retirement
After the Second World War, Ernst retired to private life.  His wife, who suffered from various illnesses died in 1942. Ernst was dedicated to church and nursing activities and was a member of the German Evangelical Church Assembly (the Kirchentag), Commander of the Württemberg-Badenschen Genossenschaft (Württemberg-Baden Cooperative), Governor of the Bailiwick of Brandenburg Order of St. John, Honorary President of the Württemberg State Association of the Red Cross as well as of the Evangelical People's League of Württemberg (Evangelischen Volksbund für Württemberg).  On 11 December 1950, Ernst died at the age 87 at Langenburg, Baden-Württemberg, in what was then West Germany.

Children
The children of Prince Ernst and Princess Alexandra of Hohelohe-Langenburg were descended from both Queen Victoria and Victoria's half-sister Feodora of Leiningen.  They were:
Gottfried Hermann Alfred Paul Maximilian Viktor Fürst zu Hohenlohe-Langenburg + b. 24 Mar 1897, d. 11 May 1960, married 20 April 1931 Princess Margarita of Greece and Denmark, sister of Prince Philip, Duke of Edinburgh.
Princess Marie Melita of Hohenlohe-Langenburg + b. 18 Jan 1899, d. 8 Nov 1967; married Wilhelm Friedrich, Duke of Schleswig-Holstein
Princess Alexandra Beatrice Leopoldine of Hohenlohe-Langenburg b. 2 Apr 1901, d. 26 Oct 1963
Princess Irma Helene of Hohenlohe-Langenburg b. 4 Jul 1902, d. 8 Mar 1986
Prince Alfred Christian of Hohenlohe-Langenburg b. 16 Apr 1911, d. 18 Apr 1911

Honours and awards
 :
 Grand Cross of the Friedrich Order, 1893
 Grand Cross of the Order of the Württemberg Crown, 1901
 : Knight of the Order of the Red Eagle, 2nd Class, 12 May 1896
 : Honorary Knight Grand Cross of the Most Honourable Order of the Bath (civil division), 22 October 1897
 : Grand Cross of the Albert Order, with Golden Star, 1900
 : Knight of the House Order of Fidelity, 1904

Ancestry

References

Bibliography
  Frank Raberg, Biographisches Handbuch der württembergischen Landtagsabgeordneten 1815–1933 [Biographical Handbook of the Members of the Landtag of Württemberg, 1815–1833], in the Kommission für geschichtliche Landeskunde in Baden-Württemberg [Commission of the Historical Studies of the State of Baden-Württemberg], (Stuttgart:  W[ilhelm]. Kohlhammer, 2001), p. 381.

1863 births
1950 deaths
People from Langenburg
People from the Kingdom of Württemberg
House of Hohenlohe-Langenburg
Princes of Hohenlohe-Langenburg
German Lutherans
Free Conservative Party politicians
Royalty in the Nazi Party
Members of the 12th Reichstag of the German Empire
Members of the Württembergian Chamber of Lords
Annulled Honorary Knights Grand Cross of the Order of the Bath